"The Bard" is an episode of the American television anthology series The Twilight Zone. It was the final episode of The Twilight Zone to be one hour long. A direct satire of the American television industry, the episode features a parody of Marlon Brando by Burt Reynolds, and concerns an inept screenwriter, who through the use of black magic, employs William Shakespeare as his ghostwriter.

Opening narration

Plot
A bumbling screenwriter, Julius K. Moomer, is becoming desperate for a sale after years working on unproduced scripts. When his agent mentions that he is submitting another writer's pitch for a television series about black magic, Julius pleads to be allowed to be given first crack at the series. Knowing nothing about the subject, he attempts some research, but turns up only an actual book of black magic. While experimenting with the book, he accidentally conjures William Shakespeare, who says he is at the service of the conjurer. Deciding not to waste Shakespeare's talent on a television pilot, Julius directs him to write a film.

The producers decide that Shakespeare's script, The Tragic Cycle, though archaic to the point of being almost incomprehensible, has potential. His task finished, Shakespeare proposes to leave. Julius argues that if he stops writing now, Shakespeare will lose his chance at Hollywood fame and become forgotten. Shakespeare at last says he will attend a rehearsal for the film and stay on if it does justice to his script. At the rehearsal, he is so horrified at the revisions by the sponsor that he assaults the leading man and storms out. Julius's next assignment, a TV special on American history, seems doomed to failure until he remembers his book on black magic, and uses it to conjure up Robert E. Lee, Ulysses S. Grant, Abraham Lincoln, George Washington, Pocahontas, Daniel Boone, Benjamin Franklin, and Theodore Roosevelt to act as consultants.

Closing narration

Cast
 Jack Weston as Julius Moomer 
 John Williams as William Shakespeare
 Burt Reynolds as Rocky Rhodes 
 Henry Lascoe as Gerald Hugo
 John McGiver as Mr. Shannon
 Howard McNear as Bramhoff
 Judy Strangis as Cora 
 Marge Redmond as Secretary
 Doro Merande as Sadie
 William Lanteau as Dolan
 Clegg Hoyt as Bus driver
 John Newton as TV interviewer 
 John Bose as Daniel Boone (uncredited)
 Rudy Bowman as Robert E. Lee (uncredited)

Notes: Weston and McGiver were previously in earlier episodes, "The Monsters Are Due on Maple Street" and "Sounds and Silences".

Production history
The episode was likely written by Rod Serling as a reaction to the advertising executives with whom he dealt regularly while producing for television. In the book The Twilight Zone Companion, Serling is quoted as saying that things were so bad with the overcautious executives that "one could not ford a river if Chevy was the sponsor."

The actor portrayed by Burt Reynolds satirizes Marlon Brando's style of method acting, augmented by the close physical resemblance between Reynolds and Brando during that period.

The episode was also featured in the final episode of The Sopranos, in 2007, "Made in America". Tony Soprano, the protagonist of the series, is seen watching this episode while in hiding from his enemies in a safe house.

References
Zicree, Marc Scott: The Twilight Zone Companion. Sillman-James Press, 1982 (second edition)
DeVoe, Bill. (2008). Trivia from The Twilight Zone. Albany, GA: Bear Manor Media. 
Grams, Martin. (2008). The Twilight Zone: Unlocking the Door to a Television Classic. Churchville, MD: OTR Publishing.

External links

Films directed by David Butler
1963 American television episodes
The Twilight Zone (1959 TV series season 4) episodes
Fictional depictions of Abraham Lincoln in television
Cultural depictions of William Shakespeare
Television episodes written by Rod Serling